I Can't Sleep may refer to:

 I Can't Sleep (film) (French: J'ai pas sommeil), a film by Claire Denis
 "I Can't Sleep" (song), a song by Clay Walker
 I Can't Sleep, a song by British rock band The La's, from their self-titled album